Cross Purposes is the seventeenth studio album by English rock band Black Sabbath, released through I.R.S. Records on 26 January 1994. The album marked the return of Tony Martin as the band's lead vocalist, after the second departure of Ronnie James Dio.

Background and recording
Dehumanizer saw the reunion of Mob Rules-era Black Sabbath, but, after the tour, Ronnie James Dio (vocals) and Vinny Appice (drums) departed. They were replaced by former Sabbath vocalist Tony Martin and former Rainbow drummer Bobby Rondinelli. Geezer Butler remained with the group, although he would depart later in the year again before the recording of the Forbidden album. Rondinelli left the recording sessions for Quiet Riot's album Terrified to join Black Sabbath. The album was recorded at Monnow Valley Studio, in Wales.

Songs
Tony Martin explained during the show at Roseland in NYC on February 12, 1995, that "Psychophobia" was about David Koresh, and the Waco, Texas, incident.

A promo video in black-and-white was shot for the song "The Hand That Rocks the Cradle". Tony Martin explained in a 2011 interview with Martin Popoff that he wrote this song about Beverly Allitt, a children's hospital nurse in England who was convicted of serial infanticide in 1993. The video features a young girl, assumably in reference to this.

The song "Cardinal Sin" was originally intended to be titled "Sin Cardinal Sin" (or "Sin, Cardinal Sin") but a printing error on the album sleeve caused the first word to be removed. Sabbath simply adopted the title "Cardinal Sin" as the name of the song.

"What's the Use?" was released only on the Japanese edition of Cross Purposes, which also contained a free sticker of the artwork. A nearly identical version of the "burning angel" image was featured on a Scorpions single three years earlier.

Reception

Critical reception

Bradley Torreano of AllMusic rated the album 3 stars out of 5, praising it for bridging various aspects of the band's different eras. He said it was "the first album since Born Again that actually sounds like a real Sabbath record" and "probably the best thing they'd released since The Mob Rules, even with the filler tracks and keyboards." In July 2014, Guitar World magazine ranked Cross Purposes at number six in the "Superunknown: 50 Iconic Albums That Defined 1994" list.

Sales
The album peaked at number 122 on the US Billboard 200 charts but made it to number 41 on the UK album charts. In both Finland and Sweden, the album hit #9.

Track listing

Personnel
Black Sabbath
Tony Martin – vocals
Tony Iommi – guitar
Geezer Butler – bass
Geoff Nicholls – keyboards
Bobby Rondinelli – drums

Technical personnel
Leif Mases – producer, engineer, mixing
Darren Galer – assistant engineer
Dave Somers – assistant engineer
Tony Cousins – mastering

Charts

References

External links
 

1994 albums
Black Sabbath albums
I.R.S. Records albums